This is a list of the seasons completed by the Oregon Ducks men's basketball.

Season-by-season results

References

 
Oregon Ducks
Oregon Ducks basketball seasons